Forrest Lee Vosler, (July 29, 1923 – February 17, 1992) was a Boeing B-17 Flying Fortress radio operator who was the second enlisted U.S. airman to receive the Medal of Honor. He also received the Air Medal and Purple Heart.

Biography
Forrest Vosler enlisted as a private in the Army at Rochester, New York, on October 8, 1942.  He took basic training at Atlantic City, New Jersey; the Radio Operator and Mechanics School at Scott Field, Illinois; and Flexible Gunnery School at Harlingen, Texas.  By May 22, 1943, he had successfully completed his training and three days later was promoted to sergeant.  He was promoted to staff sergeant in August at Pyote, Texas, while awaiting overseas movement.  In October 1943, he deployed to Europe as a radio operator and aerial gunner on B-17s assigned to the 8th Air Force's 358th Bombardment Squadron (Heavy), 303rd Bombardment Group (Heavy) based at RAF Molesworth, England.  At approximately 8:30 a.m. on December 20, 1943, Staff Sergeant Vosler took off on his fourth combat mission.  His aircraft, on its 28th combat mission, was a B-17F named the "Jersey Bounce Jr.," S/N 42-29664.  The plane and crew reached the target area of Bremen, Germany, just before noon.  The bombers encountered concentrated, accurate and intense flak over Axis territory.  In addition to the anti-aircraft fire, about 125 German fighters repeatedly attacked the formation.  This was a costly mission for the 8th Air Force as a total of 27 bombers were lost including the Jersey Bounce Jr. after it ditched in the North Sea.  Staff Sergeant Vosler was seriously wounded in action.  Vosler was hit initially in the legs and thighs and then again in the face when 20-mm. cannon shells exploded in his aircraft, and his B-17 was forced out of formation.  During the ditching, Vosler also saved the tail gunner's life.  The badly wounded gunner (Sgt. George Buske) was removed from the still-floating ditched Fortress and put on one of the wings while the other crewmen prepared the life raft.  Buske, unconscious, started to slide down the trailing edge of the wing into the water.  Vosler grabbed him around his waist while using his other hand to hold an antenna wire to avoid falling into the cold water.  Vosler accomplished this while coping with a badly wounded eye that resulted from an earlier exploding 20mm cannon shell that hit his gun position. Staff Sergeant Vosler was recommended for the Medal of Honor based on his heroism and was promoted to technical sergeant two weeks after this mission.  He was confined to Air Force hospitals in England until his return to the United States in March 1944.

President Roosevelt presented him the Medal of Honor at the White House on September 6, 1944.  Technical Sergeant Vosler continued to receive treatment at various hospitals until October 17, 1944, when he was honorably discharged from the service at Valley Forge General Hospital in Phoenixville, Pennsylvania.  He died on February 17, 1992, and is buried at Arlington National Cemetery.

Medal of Honor citation

VOSLER, FORREST L. (Air Mission)

Rank and organization: Technical Sergeant, U.S. Army Air Forces. 358th Bomber Squadron, 303d Bomber Group. Place and date. Over Bremen, Germany, December 20, 1943. Entered service at: Rochester, New York. Born: July 29, 1923, Lyndonville, New York. G.O. No.: 73, September 6, 1944.
Citation:
For conspicuous gallantry in action against the enemy above and beyond the call of duty while serving as a radio operator-air gunner on a heavy bombardment aircraft in a mission over Bremen, Germany, on 20 December 1943. After bombing the target, the aircraft in which T/Sgt. Vosler was serving was severely damaged by antiaircraft fire, forced out of formation, and immediately subjected to repeated vicious attacks by enemy fighters. Early in the engagement a 20-mm. cannon shell exploded in the radio compartment, painfully wounding T/Sgt. Vosler in the legs and thighs. At about the same time a direct hit on the tail of the ship seriously wounded the tail gunner and rendered the tail guns inoperative. Realizing the great need for firepower in protecting the vulnerable tail of the ship, T/Sgt. Vosler, with grim determination, kept up a steady stream of deadly fire. Shortly thereafter another 20-mm. enemy shell exploded, wounding T/Sgt. Vosler in the chest and about the face. Pieces of metal lodged in both eyes, impairing his vision to such an extent that he could only distinguish blurred shapes. Displaying remarkable tenacity and courage, he kept firing his guns and declined to take first-aid treatment. The radio equipment had been rendered inoperative during the battle, and when the pilot announced that he would have to ditch, although unable to see and working entirely by touch, T/Sgt. Vosler finally got the set operating and sent out distress signals despite several lapses into unconsciousness. When the ship ditched, T/Sgt. Vosler managed to get out on the wing by himself and hold the wounded tail gunner from slipping off until the other crewmembers could help them into the dinghy. T/Sgt. Vosler's actions on this occasion were an inspiration to all serving with him. The extraordinary courage, coolness, and skill he displayed in the face of great odds, when handicapped by injuries that would have incapacitated the average crewmember, were outstanding.

Taken from U.S. Air Force Biography

Military awards 
Vosler's military decorations and awards include:

See also

List of Medal of Honor recipients
List of Medal of Honor recipients for World War II
Half a Wing, Three Engines and a Prayer

References

External links
USAF Museum Fact Sheet
 

1923 births
1992 deaths
Burials at Arlington National Cemetery
People from Orleans County, New York
United States Army Air Forces Medal of Honor recipients
United States Army Air Forces personnel of World War II
Recipients of the Silver Star
Shot-down aviators
United States Army Air Forces soldiers
Recipients of the Air Medal
World War II recipients of the Medal of Honor
People from Titusville, Florida